Santa Isabel District is a district (distrito) of Colón Province in Panama. The population according to the 2000 census was 3,323; the latest official estimate (for 2019) is 3,973. The district, which lies in the east of the province along the Caribbean coast, covers a total area of 727 km². The capital lies at the town of Palenque.

Administrative divisions
The district is divided administratively into the following corregimientos:

Palenque (capital)
Cuango
Miramar
Nombre de Dios
Palmira
Playa Chiquita
Santa Isabel
Viento Frío

References

Districts of Colón Province